Belsize Park is a London Underground station in Belsize Park, north-west London. It is on the Edgware branch of the Northern line, between Hampstead and Chalk Farm stations, and is in fare zone 2. It stands at the northern end of Haverstock Hill. In July 2011 it became a Grade II listed building.

The Royal Free Hospital is located a short distance to the north of the station.

It is the only London Underground station with the letter ‘z’ in its name.

History

It is served by three lifts which descend  to the platforms. The platforms can also be reached by stairs; there are 219 steps according to the sign in the station.

The station was designed by Leslie Green in "Modern Style" and has his familiar facade of ox-blood faience with five round arched windows. It remained largely untouched until the late 1980s when the lifts were replaced and a new ticketing system installed.

Deep-level air-raid shelter

Belsize Park is one of eight London Underground stations which have deep-level air-raid shelters underneath them. The shelter was constructed in World War II to provide safe accommodation for service personnel. Entrances to the shelter are at the junction of Haverstock Hill and Downside Crescent and off Haverstock Hill.

Connections
London Buses routes 168 and C11 and night route N5 serve the station.

References

Gallery

External links

 
 
 
 

Northern line stations
Tube stations in the London Borough of Camden
Former Charing Cross, Euston and Hampstead Railway stations
Railway stations in Great Britain opened in 1907
Tube station
Leslie Green railway stations
London Underground Night Tube stations
1907 establishments in England